The Michigan–Wisconsin League was a minor league baseball league that played in the 1892 season. The six–team  Independent level Michigan–Wisconsin League evolved from the Upper Peninsula League and consisted of franchises based in Michigan and Wisconsin.

History
The Michigan–Wisconsin League first played as a semi–professional league in the 1891 season, with the Appleton, Fond du Lac, Green Bay, Marinette, Oconto and Oshkosh teams comprising the six–team league.

The Michigan–Wisconsin League became a minor league and continued play in the 1892 season as a non–signatory, Independent level league. The Green Bay Bays, Ishpeming-Negaunee Unions, Marinette Badgers, Marquette Undertakers, Menominee Wolverines and Oshkosh Indians were the charter members.

In their first season of play, the Michigan–Wisconsin League began games on May 27, 1892. Green Bay won the 1892 Michigan–Wisconsin League championship with a 48–39 overall record in the six–team league, as the Marinette and Ishpeming-Negaunee Unions franchises folded during the season. The final records were led by Green Bay, followed by the 2nd place Menominee Wolverines (44–40), Marinette Badgers (45–44) and Oshkosh Indians (41–50), with the Marquette Undertakers (20–29) and Ishpeming-Negaunee Unions (24–20) before folding.

During the season, it was reported that Green Bay president Frank W. Murphy, who also served as president of the league, supplemented his roster with players obtained from the Terre Haute Hottentots and other teams en route to winning the championship. New manager Sam LaRocque had earlier played with Terre Haute in 1892.
 
The Michigan–Wisconsin League permanently folded following the 1892 season.

Michigan-Wisconsin League teams

Standings & statistics

1892 Wisconsin–Michigan League
 Marquette and Ishpeming-Negaunee disbanded in August

Notable alumni
Baseball Hall of Fame member Hank O'Day played for the 1892 Marinette Badgers.

External links
Baseball Reference

References

Defunct minor baseball leagues in the United States
Baseball leagues in Michigan
Defunct professional sports leagues in the United States
Sports leagues established in 1892
Sports leagues disestablished in 1892
Baseball leagues in Wisconsin